The National Award for the Empowerment of Persons with Disabilities is an award for persons with disabilities in India, widely considered the most prominent award in said category in the country. Established in 1969, it has been administered by the Indian government's Ministry of Social Justice and Empowerment.

See also 

Ministry of Social Justice and Empowerment

References

External links 

Brief About National Awards | Department of Empowerment of Persons with Disabilities | MSJE | Government of India

Awards established in 1969
1969 establishments in India